The Science Museum Group (SMG) consists of five British museums:

 The Science Museum in South Kensington, London
 The Science and Industry Museum in Manchester
 The National Railway Museum in York
 The Locomotion Museum (formerly the National Railway Museum Shildon) in County Durham
 The National Science and Media Museum (formerly the National Media Museum and the National Museum of Photography, Film and Television) in Bradford

Items in the SMG collection that are not on display are usually stored at the National Collections Centre in Swindon, Wiltshire.

History
The origins of SMG lie in the internationalisation and optimism of the Great Exhibition of 1851, which enabled the foundation of the South Kensington Museum in 1857.

The term "National Museum of Science and Industry" had been in use as the Science Museum's subtitle since the early 1920s. Prior to 1 April 2012 the group was known as the National Museum of Science and Industry (NMSI).

The National Science and Media Museum, formerly the National Media Museum, was established by the Science Museum in 1983. The Science Museum was run directly by HM Government until 1984, when the Board of Trustees was established and NMSI was then adopted as a corporate title for the entire organisation. At this point NMSI became a non-departmental public body under the auspices of the sponsoring government department, the Department for Culture, Media and Sport.

From January 2012 the Science and Industry Museum in Manchester became part of the Science Museum Group.

From 2017 Locomotion, The National Railway Museum at Shildon, became part of the Science Museum Group.

In 2010 the Science Museum, London opened its climate science gallery Atmosphere which, as at April 2021, has been visited by over 5 million people.  In 2021 the Science Museum, London also opened a temporary exhibition 'Our Future Planet' which explores the science of carbon capture.   Environmental campaigners criticized the decision of SMG to appoint Shell as a major sponsor of this exhibition.

Throughout 2021 SMG is hosting Climate Talks which are a series of online talks, Q&As and events exploring problems arising from climate change. In October 2021, the SMG announced that a new climate change gallery to be opened in 2023 at the Science Museum would be sponsored by an arm of coal producer Adani Group.

SMG continues to work to reduce carbon emissions from operations, recruitment and supply chain, and by using resources efficiently. On 15 April 2021 SMG announced that it expects to achieve overall Net Zero/Carbon Neutrality by 2033.

Collection
The collection includes:
 Alan Turing's Pilot ACE computer
 Flying Scotsman
 Charles Babbage's drawing and models
 Dorothy Hodgkin's model of penicillin
 Tim Peake's Soyuz TMA-19M spaceship
 Helen Sharman's space suit
 Winifred Penn-Gaskell's collection of stamp cards and covers
 Richard Arkwright's water frame spinning machine
Over 380,000 of the items in the Science Museum Group's collections are available to view online at its Search Our Collection web page.

Chairman and Directors
The chairman of the group is Dame Mary Archer who was appointed by Prime Minister David Cameron for the four-year term from 2015 from 2018. Dame Mary Archer was reappointed as Chairman 2019–2022 in January 2018.

The following have been directors of the National Museum of Science and Industry, the Science Museum and the Science Museum Group:

 Dame Margaret Weston DBE FMA (1973–1986)
 Sir Neil Cossons OBE FSA FMA (1986–2000)
 Dr Lindsay Sharp (2000–2005)
 Prof. Martin Earwicker FREng (2006–2007)

The following have separately been directors of the NMSI:

 Prof. Martin Earwicker FREng (2007–2009)
 Molly Jackson (2009)
 Andrew Scott CBE (2009–2010)
 Ian Blatchford (2010–)

References

External links
 
 The official print website containing over 40,000 images from the various museum collections

 
National museums of the United Kingdom
Science and technology in the United Kingdom
Museums sponsored by the Department for Digital, Culture, Media and Sport
Non-departmental public bodies of the United Kingdom government
Museum organizations